Time shift or Timeshift may refer to:

 Timeshift (TV series), a BBC documentary series
 TimeShift, a video game released in 2007
 Time shifting, a form of personal consumer media recording
 Timeshift channel, used in the time-delayed rebroadcasting of television channels
 "Time Shift", an episode of the television series Mona the Vampire
 Timeshift, a free software for backup and data recovery